La Vérité sur Bébé Donge (aka The Truth About Bebe Donge or UK title: The Truth of Our Marriage) is a 1952 French film directed by Henri Decoin, and starring Danielle Darrieux and Jean Gabin. The plot is essentially the analysis of a couple's marriage that has broken down; the film is based on the novel by Georges Simenon.

References

External links

La Vérité sur Bébé Donge at filmsdefrance.com

1952 films
French black-and-white films
Films based on Belgian novels
Films based on works by Georges Simenon
French thriller drama films
1950s thriller drama films
1950s French-language films
1950s French films